The Kubja River is a river flowing through Kundapur and Gungulli in western India. It joins with the Souparnika River, Varahi River, Chakra River, and Kedaka River and merges into the Arabian Sea.

Rivers of Karnataka
Geography of Udupi district
Rivers of India